is a Japanese animator, character designer, illustrator and animation director best known for her work on Sailor Moon and as the creator of Princess Tutu.

Career
Ikuko Itoh graduated at Tokyo Designer Gakuin College, and started working as key animator and animation director for various series and movies in 1980s.

From 1992 to 1994, she was recognized from her work as an animation director for various episodes of Sailor Moon (Sailor Moon and Sailor Moon R). After R had ended, Itoh took over Kazuko Tadano's role as a character designer from Sailor Moon S in 1994 till the end of Sailor Moon SuperS in 1995.

After Sailor Moon, she character designed for Fushigi Mahou Fun Fun Pharmacy and Magic User's Club in late 1990s.

In 2002, she created and character designed Princess Tutu, a ballet fairy tale anime that is inspired from The Ugly Duckling and Swan Lake.

From 2006 and onwards, Itoh provided character designs for Living for the Day After Tomorrow, The Disappearance of Nagato Yuki-chan, and Somali and the Forest Spirit.

Works

Anime

Anime film

Notes

References

External links
 
 

Living people
Japanese animators
Japanese animated film directors
Japanese women film directors
Japanese women animators
Women television directors
Japanese television directors
Anime character designers
1961 births